Fred Couples Golf is a 1993 golf video game for the Game Gear featuring professional golfer Fred Couples. A 32X sequel, Golf Magazine: 36 Great Holes Starring Fred Couples, was released in 1995.

Gameplay

The player chooses from four generic golf courses and must compete in either a tournament, stroke play, or match play. Each golfer has their unique strengths and weaknesses. Names can be changed in addition to shirt color and the difficulty level. Through a Game Gear link, four players can play at once. Fred Couples, the golfer that endorsed the game, can only be used as an opponent. He is not available as either a teammate or as a playable character.

While the ball is on the ground, the player is shown an overhead view and must analyze it before swinging the golf club. The player can also choose a caddie as well. A password is given every time the player advances in the tournament.

Reception
GamePro gave the game a mostly negative review. Though they praised many of the game's elements, such as the practice mode, the animations, and the controls, they found the graphical layout to be a fatal flaw, and concluded "Golfing fiends may enjoy the strong details in Fred Couples Golf, but the tiny, cramped graphical layout will assault the senses of casual hackers."

References

1994 video games
Game Gear games
Game Gear-only games
Golf video games
SIMS Co., Ltd. games
Sega video games
Multiplayer and single-player video games
Cultural depictions of American men
Cultural depictions of golfers
Video games based on real people
Video games developed in Japan